The Los Angeles School of Global Studies (LASGS) is a high school located within the Miguel Contreras Learning Complex.  LASGS opened in the fall of 2006 with only Freshman and Sophomore classes as one of four New Technology High Schools in the Los Angeles area.  In the 2008–2009 school-year they reached their target and current capacity of 360 students in their first year with all four grade levels.

New Tech Network schools promote the use of project-based learning and the team-teaching of courses. LASGS in particular has made a concerted effort to integrate those team-taught courses.  Most notably all Humanities courses are taught in this model and although there are still come modifications being made to the Math and Science pairings, they are also team-taught and integrated at a far higher level than most other schools in the network. The GeoDesign course that is currently taught by Dina Mahmood, Geometry teacher, and David Brown, Design Media instructor, is another integrated, co-taught course offered to all students at LA Global Studies.

History
Los Angeles School of Global Studies was established on September 5, 2006.

In 2012, Christian Quintero, a teacher at the school took the reins as Principal of LASGS.

The Globe, LASGS's student newspaper, existed since 2005.

A program called Youth Voices is a school-based social network that was started in 2003.

In 2011 a couple of UCLA professors and students designed an 18 ft by 334 ft digital mural.

Project-based learning 

Los Angeles School of Global Studies is a project-based learning school. LASGS students work in many kinds of projects. The students work together and collaborate in many different projects that require communication and critical thinking in order to answer a driving question or a challenging question. They always work in groups and the period of time is for a month or more. The students at LASGS use websites such as Echo, a website that supports project-based learning schools. The goal of Los Angeles School of Global Studies is to prepare students to excel in an information-based and technologically advanced society.

Awards
On July 20, 2012, LASGS won the Chan P. Wick Award for Social Justice at the New Tech Network Annual Conference. This award is given to a school that demonstrates success in closing the achievement gap for underserved students, exemplifies the New Tech model and graduates students college and career ready.

References

External links

The Globe website
Youth Voices
The Mural Created

Educational institutions established in 2006
High schools in Los Angeles
Public high schools in California
Westlake, Los Angeles
2006 establishments in California